The white-tailed lark (Mirafra albicauda) is a species of lark in the family Alaudidae found in Africa.

Taxonomy and systematics
Alternate names for the white-tailed lark include northern white-tailed bush lark, northern white-tailed lark and white-tailed bush lark.

Distribution and habitat 
The white-tailed lark is found in western Chad, eastern Sudan, north-eastern South Sudan, south-central Ethiopia, and from Uganda and western Kenya to central Tanzania. It occurs mainly around Lake Chad and Lake Victoria.

The natural habitat of M. albicauda is tropical to subtropical, seasonally wet or flooded lowland grassland.

References

Mirafra
Birds of East Africa
White-tailed lark
Taxonomy articles created by Polbot